Another Man, Another Chance (Un autre homme, une autre chance, UK title: Another Man, Another Woman) is a 1977 French western film directed by Claude Lelouch.

Plot 
France in 1870: Napoleon III has just lost the war against Prussia and left the country in poverty.

Young Jeanne (Geneviève Bujold) falls in love with photographer Francis (Francis Huster), who soon takes her with him when he emigrates to The United States. In a small town in the still Wild West, they build up a small photo shop. Meanwhile animal doctor David (James Caan) lives on his lonesome farm with his wife.

It takes two years and two tragic accidents until Jeanne and David meet. Alone with a child, Jeanne has decided to return to France and is about to leave but then she and David silently and carefully fall in love for the second time in their lives and hope returns.

Cast
 James Caan - David Williams
 Geneviève Bujold - Jeanne Leroy
 Francis Huster - Francis Leroy
 Susan Tyrrell - Debby / Alice
 Jennifer Warren - Mary Williams
 Rossie Harris - Simon
 Linda Lee Lyons - Sarah
 Jacques Villeret - Customer
 Fred Stuthman - Mary's Father
 Diana Douglas - Mary's Mother
 Michael Berryman - 1st Bandit
 William S. Bartman - Telegrapher
 Dominic Barto - Wounded Man
 Dick Farnsworth - Stagecoach Driver
 George Flaherty - Sheriff Carter
 Christopher Lloyd

Reception
Filmink said "it’s a little McCabe and Mrs Miller-ish with its usual, semi-lyrical look at an old West interspersed with shocking scenes of violence. It was shot (mostly) in English with a name co-star Genevieve Bujold, but no one saw it.  More’s the pity."

References

External links
 
 

1977 films
1977 Western (genre) films
Films directed by Claude Lelouch
Films set in the 1870s
Films set in France
Films set in the United States
French Western (genre) films
United Artists films
Films scored by Francis Lai
English-language French films
1970s French films
Foreign films set in the United States